The Veli Pasha Mosque (from ) is an Ottoman building located in the Greek town of Ioannina, in the northwest region of Epirus. The mosque was renovated at the turn of the 19th century by Veli Pasha of Ioannina and formed a complex consisting in particular of a madrasa and kitchens. Today it is no longer open for worship.

History 

A first small mosque for daily prayer (masjid) was erected on the site of a Byzantine church dedicated to Saint Stephen, to the south-west of the hill of Litharitsia, about 500 meters from the Ioannina Castle. The date of construction of this primitive building is uncertain, historians suggest early (slightly after 1617) or late seventeenth  century. According to documents from 1670, the mosque then bore the name of its founder, Bali Kethuda. It was subsequently called the “Tsiekour mosque”, in reference to the surrounding district.

Ali Pasha of Ioannina, the semi-autonomous ruler of the Epirus region at the turn of the 19th century, had seraglios built in the area of the mosque for his first two sons, Mukhtar and Veli. The latter, who was notably beylerbey of Rumelia and governor of the Morea, founded a religious institution there in a waqf dating to 1804. A large landowner, he had a new mosque, a madrasa, kitchens and ancillary buildings built, notably housing a library and a khan.

Following the departure of Ottoman power in 1913 after Greece's annexation of Ioannina and the greater region of Epirus in the First Balkan War, the mosque became a barracks and its minaret was destroyed around 1930, before being seized by the Greek Ministry of Culture and Sports. The building was returned to the municipality of Ioannina and restored in 1978–1979 and 1983 by the 8th Ephorate of Byzantine Antiquities. The madrasa of the mosque housed the city's Museum of National Resistance, but it was removed in 2021, and when the building was scheduled for restoration under the auspices of the Municipality of Ioannina.

Architecture 
The mosque has a prayer hall of 6 × 6.5  m., surmounted by a dome whose octagonal drum rests on four squinches. To the north there is a porch that was initially open and crowned with three small domes, which was probably walled up after the construction of the building. The minaret, of which only the base remains today, is housed on the western façade between the porch and the prayer room. The masonry is characterized by a pseudo-isodom apparatus in cut stone, while the main dome and the roof of the porch are covered with slates.

Inside, elements of a rich marble mihrab are preserved. The kitchen building and the madrassa remain today to the north of the mosque. The old Quranic school houses the National Defense Museum of Ioannina.

See also 

 Islam in Greece
 List of former mosques in Greece
 List of mosques in Greece
 Ottoman Greece

References

Bibliography 
 .
 
 
 
 
 
 
 
 

Ottoman mosques in Greece
Former mosques in Greece
Mosque buildings with domes
Ottoman architecture in Ioannina
19th-century architecture in Greece
19th-century mosques